Dale W. Schultz (born June 12, 1953) is a Republican politician who represented the 17th District in the Wisconsin Senate from 1991 until 2015. He was previously a member of the Wisconsin State Assembly from 1982 through 1991.

Background
Schultz was born in Madison, Wisconsin, in 1953. His mother was an attorney and his father owned a pharmacy in the old Washington Hotel. Dale attended Madison Central High School and graduated from Madison West High School.

In 1975, Schultz graduated from the University of Wisconsin-Madison where he played on the Wisconsin Badgers men's basketball team and was a member of the national champion Wisconsin Badgers Crew team.

Career

Wisconsin legislature (1982-2015)
Schultz was elected to the Wisconsin State Assembly in 1982 and by special election to the Wisconsin Senate in 1991. Schultz was narrowly elected Senate Majority leader in 2004, but lost that post when Democrats took control of the Wisconsin Senate in 2006.

In addition to his official legislative duties, Senator Schultz served as a member of the Wisconsin Historical Society Board of Curators. Schultz was active with the National Conference of State Legislators (NCSL), the American Legislative Exchange Council (ALEC), and the National Conference of Insurance Legislators (NCOIL).

In 2011, Schultz was the only Senate Republican to vote against the Wisconsin budget repair bill which sparked the 2011 Wisconsin protests. Several Assembly Republicans voted against the bill as well. According to Schultz, he had intended to offer a compromise amendment to the bill, but Walker "decoyed" him, misleading him into leaving the Senate chamber.

In January 2014, Schultz stated that he would not seek reelection, citing an increasingly partisan atmosphere.

Post-legislature career
After retiring from the senate, Schultz took a position as lecturer in the social science department at the University of Wisconsin-Platteville. Schultz also began a statewide lecture series with former Democratic State Representative Mandy Wright to discuss issues with the state budget and school vouchers. Schultz endorsed Jill Underly in the 2021 election for Superintendent of Public Instruction of Wisconsin.

Family
In their spare time, Schultz and his wife Rachel own and manage their family farm, which became a Wisconsin Century Farm in 1998. They have two children, Katie and Amanda. Schultz is a member of the Wisconsin Farm Bureau, the Masons, and the Lions Club. Schultz is a licensed Wisconsin real estate broker and businessman who has interests in other businesses.

References

External links
 Senator Dale Schultz at the Wisconsin State Legislature
 constituency site
 Wis. GOP strips public workers' bargaining rights
 Dale Shultz official campaign site
 
 17th Senate District, Senator Schultz in the Wisconsin Blue Book (2005–2006)

1953 births
Living people
Politicians from Madison, Wisconsin
Businesspeople from Wisconsin
Farmers from Wisconsin
Republican Party members of the Wisconsin State Assembly
Republican Party Wisconsin state senators
Wisconsin Badgers men's basketball players
University of Wisconsin–Platteville faculty
21st-century American politicians
American men's basketball players
Madison West High School alumni